Karimabad (also Romanized as Karīmābād) is a village in Mirbag-e Jonubi Rural District, in the Central District of Delfan County, Lorestan Province, Iran. At the 2006 census, its population was 51, in 11 families.

References 

Towns and villages in Delfan County